Badoki Saikhwan ( Urdu :بدوکی‌سیکھواں)is a village Of Tehsil Nowshera Virkan, District Gujranwala, Punjab, Pakistan. It is very historical village, having remnants of Mughal Empire as well as Sikh Empire. It is located at 32°8' N 74°1' E, west of Gujranwala, the district capital. Its population was estimated to be 2500 in December 2020. It lies near the Gujranwala-Hafizabad road, 35 km west of the Gujranwala.

History

Baddoki Saikhwan is one of the most historically significant villages of the Gujranwala District. It is often locally referred to as Badoki. It was a home to Muslims and Sikhs before the Partition of India. In 1947, several Sikh families migrated from Baddoki Saikhwan to India and similarly from India several Muslim families migrated to the village. Migrant families still use the homes and lands of those who emigrated from the village.

Some Old Buildings

Education

There are many Madaras & Schools in village spreading education in area. Literacy rate of village is 58%.

Madaras
 Madrass Jamal-ul-Qur'an Yusufia (Men's)
 Madrass Talim-ul-Qur'an (Men's)
 Madrassa Hazrat Khadija R.A (Women's)
 Madrassa Aysha Siddiqa R.A (Women's)

Schools
 Govt. Primary School Badoki Saikhwan (For Boys)
 Govt. Girls High School Badoki Saikhwan (For Girls)
 Unique Islamic School System Badoki (Co-Edu)
 Learning Kingdom Girls Academy (Girls)
 Alhamd Study Center(Boys)

Religions

The major religion of village is Islam. There are also some families of Christian living.

Mosques
 Jama Masjid Nur Badoki
 Jama Masjid Haji Ramzan Wali
 Jama Masjid Maryam
 Sultan-e-Madina Mosque
 Jama Masjid Siddiq-e-Akbar

Church
Church Of All Saints

Economy
The economy of village is not very strong. GDP per capita is about 11000 PKR. Agriculture is the main occupation of most of the people of the village and many people work hard for their livelihood. Most of the paddy and wheat crops are grown in the village. Watermelons and vegetables have also been growing for the past few years. The village has four guava orchards.

Facilities

All the streets of the village are paved. There is electricity as well as gas facility. The village has a primary school for boys and a high school for girls.

Bakeries
There are four bakeries in village. These bakeries were the source of income of some villagers during COVID-19.

Transportation
Roads

The village is linked with Gujranwala-Hafizabad road, through Alipu-Nokhar Road. its also connected to a town Qila Didar Singh by shortcut road.

On Youtube
The channel named Badoki Saikhwan is on Youtube having only 22 subscribers with about 7 videos. There are 136 views.

Visit Channel 
.

Nearby villages
 Udhowali
 Hamboki
 Kot Ladha
 Phokar Pur
 Philloki
 Chabba Sindhwan
 Noian Wala

See also
 Qila Didar Singh
 Nowshera Virkan
 Gujranwala
 Noian Wala
 Chabba Sindhwan
 Hamboki

References

External links
  Villages Detail Of Gujranwala District

Villages in Gujranwala District